Chelidonura livida is a species of sea slug, or "headshield slug", a marine opisthobranch gastropod mollusk in the family Aglajidae.

Description
Chelidonura livida can reach a length of about 10–50 mm. The body is black or dark brown, with bright blue spots or rings.

Distribution
This headshield slug lives in the Red Sea, Madagascar and in the tropical western Indian Ocean up to northern Australia and Philippines.

Habitat
It is a sand dwelling species that can be found on intertidal shallow sand flats.

References
 Chelidonura livida. SeaSlug Forum
 WoRMS
 Nudipixel

External links
 

Aglajidae
Gastropods described in 1994